The Hornsleth Village Project was a controversial conceptual art project by Danish artist Kristian von Hornsleth in which he went to the Ugandan village of Buteyongera and paid impoverished villagers to legally change their names to "Hornsleth". In exchange for consenting to have "Hornsleth" added to their identity documents, the villagers were given livestock. The project began in June 2006; in October 2006, Kampala officials put a stop to the project, citing ethical reasons.

By that time, 270 newly renamed Hornsleths had each received a pig, and another 70 had each received a goat.

Hornsleth, who said that he would like it if the village's name were eventually changed as well, described it as a straightforward business transaction, wherein he paid the villagers to participate in his project and pose for photographs.

The Ugandan Minister of Ethics, James Nsaba Buturo, criticized Hornsleth as being a cult leader, obscene, mentally deranged, evil, racist, and a homosexual, and the project as demeaning, and stated that official diplomatic measures would be taken. Nsaba Buturo also protested against Hornsleth's use of the Ugandan national flag and the crested crane (Uganda's national bird) on the invitation cards to Hornsleth's photo exhibition in Copenhagen, entitled "We Can Help You, But We Want To Own You".

By June 2008, "most" of the residents of Buteyongera had gone back to their original names, and by 2012, Hornsleth was cited by Ugandan law enforcement as an example of "foreign nationals" who have "ulterior, selfish motives".

References

External links
Hornsleth Village Project - official site, includes photographs of newly renamed Hornsleths with identity documents.

2006 establishments in Uganda
Conceptual art